Goble Park is a multi-use stadium in Bethlehem, South Africa.  It is currently used mostly for football matches. It is used as home venue by both Free State Stars F.C. and Super Eagles F.C. in the Premier Soccer League and National First Division respectively. The stadium has a capacity of 5,000 people.

External links
Venue information 
Venue image

Soccer venues in South Africa
Sports venues in the Free State (province)
Free State Stars F.C.